Enis Arıkan (born 3 January 1983) is a Turkish actor, comedian and TV presenter.

Born in Istanbul, Arıkan took acting lessons at Müjdat Gezen Art Center and later graduated with a degree in Stage and Performing Arts from Istanbul Bilgi University. He made his debut in 1998 with a role in the TV series Aynalı Tahir. He continued his career in television by appearing in various TV series, including Çekirdek Aile, Kadın İsterse, Genco, Aşk ve Ceza, Cesur Hemşire and Hayat Ağacı.

Arıkan performed in various plays, including Hamlet, Kürklü Merkür, Kutlama, Altın Ejderha, Makas, 10 11 12, Garaj, Alice, and Ayı. He won the Sadri Alışık Best Theatre Actor Award for Garaj. He also won the Antalya Television Best Supporting Comedy Actor for his role in the comedy series Yerden Yüksek. He portrayed an autistic person in the drama series Uçurum. He played with Ezgi Mola for many times. His breakthrough came with his role as Tony in the comedy series Jet Sosyete by Gülse Birsel.

In 2019, he began presenting Benimle Söyle, the Turkish version of All Together Now. In 2021, he began presenting his own talk show @Enis Arıkan.

Filmography

Awards

References

External links 
 
 

1983 births
Male actors from Istanbul
Istanbul Bilgi University alumni
Turkish male television actors
Turkish male film actors
Turkish male stage actors
Living people